Seki Station (関駅) is the name of two train stations in Japan:

Seki Station (Gifu)
 Seki Station (Mie)